Ambabhona is a town in Bargarh district, Odisha.

Bargarh district